KHTH (101.7 FM) is a commercial radio station in Santa Rosa, California, broadcasting a contemporary hit radio (Top 40/CHR) radio format.  It is owned by Lawrence Amaturo.

History
The station was originally KXFX and previously had an active rock format branded as 101.7 The Fox. On March 24, 2011, the call letters changed from KXFX to KHTH and changed from an active rock format to a CHR format as Hot 101.7.

On July 30, 2022, the station's HD2 subchannel changed its format from classic hits a "K-Hits 107.9" to oldies as "Oldies 107.9".

Previous logo

References

External links

Contemporary hit radio stations in the United States
HTH
Mass media in Sonoma County, California
Mass media in Santa Rosa, California